Anomalepis flavapices is a species of snake in the Anomalepididae family. It is endemic to Ecuador.

References

Anomalepididae
Snakes of South America
Reptiles of Ecuador
Endemic fauna of Ecuador
Reptiles described in 1957